The Government College (Autonomous) is located on the banks of River Godavari in Rajamahendravaram, Andhra Pradesh, India. It has been recognized as the 'College with Potential for Excellence' by the University Grants Commission in 2016.

History
The Government Arts College was started as a District school in 1853 and was upgraded as a Provincial school of Madras Presidency in 1868. It was made a college in 1885. It was affiliated to University of Madras in 1891 and later to Andhra University in 1926.

Academic Programmes
The college offers undergraduates and postgraduate programmes in arts and science affiliated to the Adikavi Nannaya University. It has been accredited by NAAC with an A+ Grade (CGPA 3.38).

Notable alumni

 Adivi Bapiraju, artist
 V. K. Krishna Menon, former Defence Minister of India
 Varahagiri Jogayya Panthulu, Illustrious father of V. V. Giri(Former President of India)
 Tanguturi Prakasam, first Chief Minister of the Indian province Andhra state.
 Sarvepalli Radhakrishnan, second president of India (served as a philosophy lecturer)
 Gadicherla Harisarvottama Rao, freedom fighter in the Indian independence movement
 Damerla Rama Rao, artist
 Koka Subba Rao, former Chief Justice
 Kurma Venkata Reddy Naidu, lawyer, professor, politician and Justice Party leader who served as the Governor of Madras Presidency in 1936.
 P S Rau, ICS Chairman, Former Givernor of Kerala, Padma Bhushan Awardee
 Kavikondala Venkat Rao, Lyricist in Telugu Cinema

References

External links
 Official Website

Arts colleges in India
Colleges in Andhra Pradesh
Education in Rajahmundry
Educational institutions established in 1853
1853 establishments in India
Arts organizations established in 1853
Colleges affiliated to Andhra University
Academic institutions formerly affiliated with the University of Madras